James Colin Went (born 7 January 1982) is an English cricketer.  Went is a left-handed batsman who bowls right-arm medium pace.  He was born at Reading, Berkshire.

Went represented the Essex Cricket Board in a single List A match against Essex in the 2003 Cheltenham & Gloucester Trophy.  In his only List A match, he scored a single run and with the ball he took a single wicket at a cost of 64 runs from 10 overs.

He currently plays club cricket for Hornchurch Cricket Club.

References

Jamie Currently plays for Wickford Cricket Club.

External links
Jamie Went at Cricinfo
Jamie Went at CricketArchive

1982 births
Living people
Sportspeople from Reading, Berkshire
English cricketers
Essex Cricket Board cricketers